Dinovernavirus is a genus of double-stranded RNA viruses in the family Reoviridae and subfamily Spinareovirinae. Member viruses replicate in a variety of mosquito cell lines. The name is an abbreviation for double-stranded, insect, novem (Latin for nine the number of genome segments), rna virus. There is one species in the genus: Aedes pseudoscutellaris reovirus.

Structure
Viruses in Dinovernavirus are non-enveloped. Their capsid is turreted and single shelled with icosahedral geometries and T=2 symmetry. The diameter is around 49–50 nm.

Genome 
Genomes are linear and segmented. There are nine segments which code for nine proteins.

Life cycle
Viral replication is cytoplasmic. Entry into the host cell is achieved by attachment to host receptors, which mediates endocytosis. Replication follows the double-stranded RNA virus replication model. Double-stranded RNA virus transcription is the method of transcription. The virus exits the host cell by monopartite non-tubule guided viral movement. Mosquito serve as the natural host.

Taxonomy
There is one species in the genus: 

Aedes pseudoscutellaris reovirus

References

External links
 Viralzone: Dinovernavirus
 ICTV

Virus genera
Spinareovirinae